Mıxlıqovaq (also, Mykhlykovag, Mykhlykuvak, and Mykhlykuvakh) is a village and municipality in the Qabala Rayon of Azerbaijan.  It has a population of 3,788.  The municipality consists of the villages of Mıxlıqovaq and Solquca.
The village is locally famous for honey.

References 

Populated places in Qabala District